Asbestos Records is an American independent record label in Stratford, Connecticut, United States, founded in 1996. It was established as a business to release albums and compilations for local bands, and to book shows at the Newtown Teen Center.

Over the next eight years, Asbestos Records released albums from Connecticut bands including Slackjaw, Grover Dill, and West Beverly, whose members went on to join bands such as Dropkick Murphys, In Pieces, Staring Back, and Punchline.

The label was also the home of the first four album covers by artist Rob Dobi, known for his parody of emo fashion, How to Dress Emo, and his clothing company Full Bleed.

In 2007, the label began a project to reissue popular Third-Wave Ska albums from defunct labels, including albums by from The Mighty Mighty Bosstones, The Suicide Machines, The Slackers, Spring Heeled Jack U.S.A., The Toasters, and Mustard Plug. The label was also involved in reissuing the portion of They Might Be Giants' discography that was originally released on Elektra Records.

In a collaboration between Asbestos Records, Chicago's Underground Communiqué Records and Ska Is Dead, the three labels started a "Ska Is Dead" 7-inch subscription series made up of six split 7-inch records, each featuring two currently active ska bands.

References

External links
Asbestos Records Official Site

American record labels
Alternative rock record labels
Record labels established in 1996
Ska record labels